Seondugu is a dong, or precinct, in Geumjeong-gu, Busan, South Korea.  It was created in 1998 when the former districts Seon-dong and Dugu-dong were amalgamated.

See also
Geography of South Korea
Administrative divisions of South Korea

References

Geumjeong District
Neighbourhoods in Busan